Bernex is:

Bernex, a commune of the Canton of Geneva, Switzerland
Bernex, a commune of the Haute-Savoie département, in France